The Princess Rooney Stakes is a Grade III American Thoroughbred horse race for fillies and mares aged three and older over a distance of seven furlongs on the dirt run annually in early July at Gulfstream Park in Hallandale Beach, Florida.

History 

The inaugural running of the event was on 10 August 1985 at Calder Race Course as the Princess Rooney Handicap.

The event is named in honor for the U.S. Hall of Fame filly Princess Rooney, who won her first four starts at the Calder racetrack.

The event was contested at a distance of seven furlongs until 1997. The event was run at six furlongs from 1998 to 2015. 

In 1999, the event was upgraded to Grade III status by the Thoroughbred Owners and Breeders Association and carried a $300,000 purse. Three years later the event was upgraded again to Grade II. The event was a Grade I event from 2006 to 2014. 

In 2014 the event was not held and after negotiations between Calder Race Track and Gulfstream Park the event was moved to Gulfstream Park. 

In 2015 the event was downgraded back to Grade III. The event was modified as the Princess Rooney Stakes beginning with its 2015 running when the conditions of the event were changed from handicap to stakes allowance.

In 2016 the distance of the event was increased back to the original 7 furlongs.

The event today continues to be part of the Breeders' Cup Challenge "Win and You're In" series.

In 2020 due to the COVID-19 pandemic in the United States, Gulfstream Park did not schedule the event in their updated and shortened spring-summer meeting.

Since 2021 the event has been an invitational event.

Records

Speed record: 
7 furlongs:  1:21.68 - Curlin's Approval  (2017)
6 furlongs:  1:09.29 - Merry Meadow (2015)

Margins:
 lengths -  Game Face  (2009)

Most wins:
 2 - Classy Tricks (1986, 1987)
 2 - Magal (1991, 1992)
 2 - Gold Mover (2002, 2003)
 2 - Stormy Embrace (2018, 2019)
 2 - Ce Ce (2021, 2022)
 

Most wins by a jockey:
 3 - Jerry Bailey (2002, 2003, 2005)

Most wins by a trainer:
 5 - Martin D. Wolfson (1995, 1996, 2010, 2013, 2017)

Most wins by an owner:
 2 - Harry Katz (1986, 1987)
 2 - Dolares S. Tamargo (1991, 1992)
 2 - Edward P. Evans (2002, 2003)
 2 - Matalona Thoroughbreds (2018, 2019)
 2 - Bo Hirsch (2021, 2022)

Winners

See also
List of American and Canadian Graded races

References

Sprint category horse races for fillies and mares
Graded stakes races in the United States
Grade 2 stakes races in the United States
Horse races in Florida
Recurring sporting events established in 1985
Gulfstream Park
1985 establishments in Florida